Camille DeAngelis (born November 14, 1980) is an American novelist and travel writer. Her novel about teenage cannibals, Bones & All, won an Alex Award in 2016. The storyline deals with issues such as feminism, loneliness and self loathing, and the moral problem of flesh eating. A film adaptation was released in 2022.

DeAngelis also published a self-help/memoir entitled Life Without Envy: Ego Management for Creative People in September 2016.

References 

1980 births
21st-century American non-fiction writers
21st-century American novelists
21st-century American women writers
American self-help writers
American travel writers
American women novelists
American women travel writers
Living people
Place of birth missing (living people)